The Louisiana Sports Hall of Fame is located in the Louisiana Sports Hall of Fame & Northwest Louisiana History Museum – Natchitoches in a new facility in the downtown historic district in Natchitoches, Louisiana. After years of planning and construction, the LHOF opened on June 28, 2013. Lieutenant Governor Jay Dardenne, whose office handles state tourism matters, was on hand for the grand opening.

The museum had been fifty-five years in search of a permanent home. Many of the artifacts had previously been stored at Prather Coliseum on the campus of Northwestern State University in Natchitoches. Because of Hurricane Katrina there had been fear that the proposed museum would be deleted from approved projects in 2005 by the Louisiana Bond Commission. Then State Representative Taylor Townsend, however, informed Hall of Fame executive director Doug Ireland that the sports museum, unlike other similar proposals, had survived the vetting process. Natchitoches Mayor Lee Posey said the museum is a "tremendous" boost to Natchitoches-area tourism.

Inductees
The first inductees were named to the Hall of Fame in 1958.

References

External links
 

Halls of fame in Louisiana
State sports halls of fame in the United States
All-sports halls of fame
Sports hall of fame inductees
Sports in Louisiana
Museums in Natchitoches Parish, Louisiana
Sports in Natchitoches, Louisiana
Awards established in 1958
1958 establishments in Louisiana